Krupa "Kira" Narayanan (born 26 January 1994) is a Malaysian actress, anchor, musician and TV personality. She is known for hosting Cricket Live on the Star Sports Network and for playing the role of Princess Jasmine in Disney and BookMyShow's Aladdin the Musical in India.

Personal life
Kira grew up in Kuala Lumpur, Malaysia and found her calling as an actress at the age of 13. She did her schooling from Garden International School. She read BSc Psychology at University College London, concurrently earning her Diploma in Acting for Film from the New York Film Academy (New York) and her membership at the National Youth Theatre of Great Britain (London).

Career

Television 
Kira debuted as an English Television Sports Anchor for Star Sports India during Vivo Pro Kabaddi Season 7 (2019). She then went on to anchor for "Cricket Live" in the absence of Mayanti Langer, hosting her first Indian Premier League (IPL) in 2020, as well as the India/England Test, ODI and T20I Series in 2021. She's appeared alongside cricket greats and network regulars Sunil Gavaskar, Brian Lara, Brett Lee, VVS Laxman, Gautham Gambhir, Greame Swann, Lisa Sthalekhar, Irfan Pathan, Harbhajan Singh and Dean Jones.

Stage 
Kira was cast by Tess Joseph to play the Disney Princess Jasmine in the stage Musical version of the Disney film Aladdin, created by Disney India and produced by ticketing giant BookMyShow.

In 2019, Kira stepped into the iconic shoes of Audrey Hepburn and Julie Andrews to play the role of Eliza Doolittle in Rael Padamsee's My Fair Lady the Musical.

Web series 
In the 2019 web series Minus One, Kira appeared as Devika/Lavanya opposite Indian web stars Aisha Ahmed and Ayush Mehra.

Film 

Kira made her feature film debut as Sri Devi (a classical dancer) in the 2018 Tamil Picture Koothan, where she starred alongside Kollywood greats Urvashi, Bhagyaraj and Manobala.

Work and filmography

Television

Plays/Musicals

Films

Web series

References

External links
 
 Kira Narayanan on Instagram
 Kira Narayanan on Facebook

Living people
1994 births
People from Kuala Lumpur
Tamil actresses
Malaysian film actresses
Malaysian television actresses
Malaysian people of Indian descent
Malaysian people of Tamil descent
Malaysian stage actresses
Malaysian television personalities
Actresses in Tamil cinema
Malaysian expatriate actresses in India
Malaysian expatriates in the United Kingdom
Alumni of University College London
New York Film Academy alumni
21st-century Malaysian actresses